is a residential and commercial district of Minato, Tokyo, Japan, located west of the government center in Nagatachō and north of the Roppongi district.

Akasaka (including the neighboring area of Aoyama) was a ward of Tokyo City from 1878 to 1947, and maintains a branch office of the Minato City government.

Notable sites

Akasaka Sacas
Embassy of the United States, Mexico, Cambodia, Canada, Iraq, Spain and Syria as well as San Marino
Ark Hills and Suntory Hall
Hikawa Shrine
Nogi Shrine
Tokyo Midtown - currently the tallest high-rise complex in Tokyo
Takahashi Korekiyo's residence and memorial park
 Riki Mansion home of Rikidōzan
In neighbouring Moto-Akasaka (literally "original Akasaka") to the North:
Akasaka Palace (State Guest House)
Togu Palace Residence of the Crown Prince of Japan

Companies based in Akasaka

 DefSTAR Records 4-5 Akasaka
 EMI Music Japan 5-3-1 Akasaka
 Epic Records Japan 9-6-35 Akasaka
 Fujifilm
 Fuji Xerox
 Hazama Ando
 Hudson Soft
 JETRO (Japan External Trade Organization)-1-12-32 Akasaka
 Johnny & Associates 8-11-20 Akasaka
 Ki/oon Records: Same as Epic Records Japan
 Kaneka Corporation
 Komatsu 2-3-6 Akasaka
 Sigma Seven 2-16-8 Akasaka
 Tokyo Broadcasting System Holdings, Inc. 5-3-6 Akasaka
 Tokyo Broadcasting System Television, Inc.
 TBS Radio & Communications, Inc.
 BS-TBS, Inc.
 C-TBS, Inc.
 Toraya Confectionery
 Universal Music Japan LLC 8-5-30 Akasaka
 Wa Group Japan 4-3-27 Akasaka
 Geneon Universal Entertainment 5-2-20 Akasaka
 WOWOW (Akasaka Park Building)

The Japanese offices of the following are based in Akasaka:
 Becton, Dickinson and Company 4-15-1 Akasaka
 Clifford Chance
 Iran Air
 ING 4-1 Akasaka
 Milbank Tweed
 Thomson Reuters
 GlaxoSmithKline Japan

Subway stations

Akasaka Station (Tokyo Metro Chiyoda Line)
Akasaka-mitsuke Station (Tokyo Metro: Ginza Line, Marunouchi Line, connected to Nagatacho Station via underpasses)
Nagatacho Station (Tokyo Metro Hanzōmon Line, Tokyo Metro Yurakucho Line, Tokyo Metro Namboku Line, connected to Akasaka-mitsuke Station via passageways)
Aoyama-itchōme Station (Tokyo Metro Hanzomon Line, Tokyo Metro Ginza Line, Toei Oedo Line)
Nogizaka Station (Tokyo Metro Chiyoda Line)
Tameike-Sannō Station (Tokyo Metro: Ginza Line, Namboku Line, connected to Kokkai-gijidomae Station via passageways)

Education

Schools
Akasaka's public elementary and junior high schools are operated by the Minato City Board of Education ( in English, in Japanese).

Akasaka 1-9-chōme are zoned to Akasaka Elementary School (赤坂小学校) and Akasaka Junior High School (赤坂中学校).

  was operated by the Tokyo Metropolitan Government Board of Education. It closed down in March 2009.

Third Junior & Senior High School of Nihon University was previously in Akasaka, but it moved to Machida in 1976.

Libraries
The Akasaka Library has moved to a new building in 2007, near the Aoba Park and the Aoyama-itchōme subway station.

References

External links

 
Areas of Tokyo
Districts of Minato, Tokyo